Ashoke Mustafi (1 December 1933 – 30 July 2020) was an Indian cricketer. He played two first-class matches for Bengal in 1958/59.

See also
 List of Bengal cricketers

References

External links
 

1933 births
2020 deaths
Indian cricketers
Bengal cricketers
Cricketers from Kolkata